Karen Nelson may refer to:
 Karen E. Nelson, Jamaican-born American microbiologist
 Karen Nelson (athlete), Canadian hurdler